Mount Henry Lucy is a prominent peak,  high, standing  south-southeast of Mount White at the southern end of the Supporters Range, Antarctica. It was discovered by the British Antarctic Expedition, 1907–09, and named for Henry Lucy, who publicized Ernest Shackleton's expedition and assisted in obtaining a financial grant from Parliament for the expedition.

References

Mountains of the Ross Dependency
Dufek Coast